The Marfa lights, also known as the Marfa ghost lights, have been observed near U.S. Route 67 on Mitchell Flat east of Marfa, Texas, in the United States. They have gained some fame as onlookers have attributed them to paranormal phenomena such as ghosts, UFOs, or will-o'-the-wisp. Scientific research suggests that most, if not all, are atmospheric reflections of automobile headlights and campfires.

Overview
According to Judith Brueske, "The 'Marfa Lights' of west Texas have been called many names over the years, such as ghost lights, weird lights, strange lights, car lights, mystery lights, or Chinati lights. The favorite place from which to view the lights is a widened shoulder on Highway 90 about nine miles east of Marfa. The lights are most often reported as distant spots of brightness, distinguishable from ranch lights and automobile headlights on Highway 67 (between Marfa and Presidio, to the south) primarily by their aberrant movements."

Robert and Judy Wagers define "Classic Marfa Lights" as being seen south-southwest of the Marfa Lights Viewing Center (MLVC). They define the left margin of the viewing area as being aligned along the Big Bend Telephone Company tower as viewed from the MLVC, and the right margin as Chinati Peak as viewed from the MLVC.

Referring to the Marfa Lights View Park east of Marfa (coordinates: 30°16'30"N   103°52'59"W), James Bunnell states, "you might just see mysterious orbs of light suddenly appear above desert foliage. These balls of light may remain stationary as they pulse on and off with intensity varying from dim to almost blinding brilliance. Then again, these ghostly lights may dart across the desert...or perform splits and mergers. Light colors are usually yellow-orange but other hues, including green, blue and red are also seen. Marfa Mystery Lights (MLs) usually fly above desert vegetation but below background mesas."

History
The first historical record of the Marfa lights was in 1883 when a young cowhand, Robert Reed Ellison, saw a flickering light while he was driving cattle through Paisano Pass and wondered if it was the campfire of Apache Indians. Other settlers told him they often saw the lights, but that when they investigated they found no ashes or other evidence of a campsite. Joe and Anne Humphreys next reported seeing the lights in 1885. Both stories appear in Cecilia Thompson's book History of Marfa and Presidio County, Texas 1535–1946, which was published in 1985.

The first published account of the lights appeared in the July 1957 issue of Coronet magazine. In 1976 Elton Miles's Tales of the Big Bend included stories dating to the 19th century and a photograph of the Marfa lights by a local rancher.

Bunnell lists 34 Marfa lights sightings from 1945 through 2008. Monitoring stations were put in place starting in 2003. He has identified "an average of 9.5 MLs on 5.25 nights per year", but believes that the monitoring stations may only be finding half of the Marfa lights in Mitchell Flat.

Explanations

Atmospheric phenomena

Skeptic Brian Dunning notes that the designated "View Park" for the lights, a roadside park on the south side of U.S. Route 90 about 9 miles (14 km) east of Marfa, is at the site of Marfa Army Airfield, where tens of thousands of personnel were stationed between 1942 and 1947, training American and Allied pilots. This massive field was then used for years as a regional airport, with daily airline service. Since Marfa AAF and its satellite fields are each constantly patrolled by sentries, they consider it unlikely that any unusual phenomena would remain unobserved and unmentioned. According to Dunning, the likeliest explanation is that the lights are a sort of mirage caused by sharp temperature gradients between cold and warm layers of air.  Marfa is at an elevation of 4,688 ft (1,429 m) above sea level, and temperature differentials of 40–50 °F (22–28 °C) between high and low temperatures are quite common.

Car lights

In May 2004 a group from the Society of Physics Students at the University of Texas at Dallas spent four days investigating and recording lights observed southwest of the view park using traffic volume-monitoring equipment, video cameras, binoculars, and chase cars. Their report made the following conclusions:
 U.S. Highway 67 is visible from the Marfa lights viewing location.
 The frequency of lights southwest of the view park correlates with the frequency of vehicle traffic on U.S. 67.
 The motion of the observed lights was in a straight line, corresponding to U.S. 67.
 When the group parked a vehicle on U.S. 67 and flashed its headlights, this was visible at the view park and appeared to be a Marfa light.
 A car passing the parked vehicle appeared as one Marfa light passing another at the view park.

They came to the conclusion that all the lights observed over a four-night period southwest of the view park could be reliably attributed to automobile headlights traveling along U.S. 67 between Marfa and Presidio, Texas.

Spectroscopic analysis

For 20 nights in May 2008, scientists from Texas State University used spectroscopy equipment to observe lights from the Marfa lights viewing station. They recorded a number of lights that "could have been mistaken for lights of unknown origin", but in each case the movements of the lights and the data from their equipment could be easily explained as automobile headlights or small fires.

In popular media
The lights have been featured and mentioned in various media, including the television show Unsolved Mysteries and an episode of King of the Hill ("Of Mice and Little Green Men") and in an episode of the Disney Channel Original Series So Weird. A book by David Morrell, 2009's The Shimmer, was inspired by the lights. The Rolling Stones mention the "lights of Marfa" in the song "No Spare Parts" from the 2011 re-release of their 1978 album Some Girls. Country music artist Paul Cauthen wrote "Marfa Lights," a love song inspired by the lights, for his 2016 album "My Gospel."
In the 2019 Simpsons episode "Mad About the Toy", the family visits Marfa.
Lisa tries to explain the lights but is prevented by Marge.

See also

 Aleya (Ghost light), Bengal
 Aurora
 Brown Mountain lights
 Chir Batti
 Gurdon Light
 Hessdalen lights
 Min Min light
 Paulding Light
 The Spooklight
 St. Louis light

References
Notes

Bibliography
 
 James Bunnell, Strange Lights in West Texas. Lacey Publishing Company, Benbrook, TX, 2015 
 
 Herbert Lindee, "Ghosts Lights of Texas," Skeptical Inquirer, Vol. 166, No. 4, Summer 1992, pp. 400–406
 Elton Miles, Tales of the Big Bend, Texas A&M University Press, 1976, pp. 149–167 
 Dennis Stacy, "The Marfa Lights, A Viewer's Guide," Seale & Stacy, San Antonio, TX  1989 
 
 David Stipp, "Marfa, Texas, Finds a Flickering Fame in Mystery Lights," Wall Street Journal, March 21, 1984, p. A1.
 Cecilia Thompson, History of Marfa and Presidio County, Texas 1535–1946, Volume 1, 1535–1900 (Marfa, TX: The Presidio County Historical Commission, 1985), 194, 197

External links
 
 DeMystifying the "Marfa Lights"
 "Marfa Lights" – from the Skeptic's Dictionary
 Discussion of the Marfa Lights (and other 'ghost lights')
 Texas Monthly article "The Truth Is Out There"

Reportedly haunted locations in Texas
Atmospheric ghost lights
Weather lore
Environment of Texas
Marfa, Texas
UFO-related phenomena
Unexplained phenomena